Abednigo Valdez "Shaka" Ngcobo (10 May 1950 – 1 November 2014) was a South African association football player who played in South Africa for Penarol, Minnesota Kicks, Denver Dynamos and Kaizer Chiefs.

Club career
Ngcobo was born in Cato Manor near Durban, South Africa, and started played amateur soccer at a young age for African Bush Rangers, Rand Koreans, Union Jacks. He later joined Zulu Royals and African Wanderers in the new NPSL for blacks in 1971. In 1972, Ngcobo was recruited by Kaizer Chiefs' Ewert Nene when he scored 6 goals against them in a friendly match. In 1974, he won the league and the BP Top 8 and in the same season he scored a hat trick in a 7–1 win over Moroka Swallows. He left for Denver Dynamos in 1975 after leading Chiefs to their first ever league title the previous season with Kaizer Motaung and Patrick Ntsoelengoe. Motaung scored seven goals that season, providing one assist, Ntsoelengoe scored five goals and four assists and Ngcobo netted five times, while delivering six assists. The following season, Ngcobo and Ntsoelengoe both moved to Minnesota Kicks. In 1976 where he won the Benson and Hedges Trophy, Sales House Cup and the BP Top 8 he set a new record of the fastest goal scored in 10 seconds in a 3–1 win over Moroka Swallows on 11 October 1976 in Vosloorus. In February 1980, before being named the 1979 Footballer of Year, he scored against Highlands Park in that famous Mainstay Cup Final replay and he scored a 13-minute hat-trick against Moroka Swallows. He went AWOL for trials in Uruguay with Penarol organised by Mario Tuani along with Goodenough Nkomo upon returning he was fined R1000. He later played for Penarol being striker partners with young Venancio Ramos and Fernando Morena. After suffering from niggling knee injuries later in his career, Valdez retired in December 1984.

International career
Ngcobo played for the SA Black XI in 1973 in a match against a team billed as the UK All Stars. He played in a second match against another All Stars side in 1979, at the Rand Stadium.

Style of play
Former Marabastad Sundowns player and older brother of Zane Moosa, Essop "Smiley" Moosa said " 'Shaka' had great speed and he was unbelievably strong. He could play both as a striker and as a winger, the last position being his best, I felt. He was also a fantastic goalscorer, he had a very educated left-foot, but he could score with both feet." Former Chiefs captain between 1975 and 1986, Ryder Mofokeng said "he could dribble past defenders, he could pass, he could cross and he could shoot. He was one of the best all-round strikers South Africa had."

After retirement
Ngcobo ran a taxi business in Alexandra and lived with his wife Khanyisile and his daughter.

Death
He died of a heart attack at his home on 1 November 2014, after complaining of chest pains early that morning and died a few hours later.

References

1950 births
2014 deaths
South African soccer players
South African expatriate soccer players
South African soccer managers
Association football forwards
Kaizer Chiefs F.C. players
Sportspeople from Durban
North American Soccer League (1968–1984) players
Minnesota Kicks players
Denver Dynamos players
South African expatriate sportspeople in the United States
Expatriate soccer players in the United States
Peñarol players
Expatriate footballers in Uruguay